A list of official sports governing bodies, federations and associations for Sport in Japan.

 
governing bodies